Hartmut Becker (6 May 1938 – 22 January 2022) was a German actor. He played Sgt. Gustav Wagner in Escape From Sobibor in 1987. He also starred in the 1970 film o.k., which was also entered into the 20th Berlin International Film Festival. However, the competition was cancelled and no prizes were awarded, over controversy surrounding the film. After O.K. Hartmut Becker was one of Germany’s busiest actors in film and theatre (at the State Theatres of Munich and Berlin he performed leading characters in plays from Shakespeare to Tennessee Williams). More important main parts in films followed like in Verhoeven's He Who Loves in a Glass House (International Film Festival Berlin 1971), When Mother Went on Strike, John Ralling (TV), Audienz (TV), Sunday Children.

Career
Becker was born in Berlin on 6 May 1938. His first leading part in an English-language production, Becker performed in the BBC film Forgive Our Foolish Ways, where he played the role of a German prisoner of war next to Kate Nelligan. The television film became a very big success all over the world. Hartmut's following international film was the American-English production Jenny's War  (Columbia Pictures), where he portrayed the main part of Karl Koenig, a character in the crucial test between love and war. His partners in this film were Dyan Cannon, Elke Sommer and Trevor Howard. For his widely praised performance in the following American production Escape from Sobibor (director: Jack Gold, also starring Alan Arkin and Rutger Hauer) Hartmut had been nominated for an Emmy Award 1988. In his next "Festival-Film" The Tenth One in Hiding (Festival International du Film Cannes 1989) Becker worked together with director Lina Wertmüller. His female partner in this feature film was Dominique Sanda.

Several dream parts followed after the success of The Tenth One in Hiding, for example the characters Niels Jost in A Quiet Conspiracy (Channel 4; director: John Gorrie; also starring Joss Ackland), Rauscher in the American film Triumph of the Spirit (director: Robert M. Young; with Willem Dafoe, Robert Loggia), Lutz in the English-French Television film Free Frenchmen (also starring Derek de Lint, Agnes Soral, directed by Jim Goddard), Moritz in the English-Austrian feature film Gavre Princip by Peter Patzak, King Christian in Young Catherine (American TV; with a.o. Vanessa Redgrave, Julia Ormond, Marthe Keller, Maximilian Schell; director: Michael Anderson), Rusty in the Italian TV-film Requiem per Voce e Pianoforte (RAI DUE), and last but not least Dieter Krause in the English TV-thriller The Waiting Time (ITV 1999; director: Stuart Orme). His last leading roles in German feature films of the last years were The Unforgotten, Montag kommen die Fenster/Windows will drive on Monday (International Filmfestival Berlin), The Gift and Amatores Meae Matris.

Between 2007 and 2012 Becker was a member in the committee of the German Academy of Film (Deutsche Filmakademie). 
As a songwriter and singer his first single was produced in 2013.

Becker died of cancer in Berlin on 22 January 2022, at the age of 83.

Selected filmography

 Student of the Bedroom (1970), as Schläger auf Fest
 o.k. (1970, International Filmfestival Berlin), as Ralph Clarke
 He Who Loves in a Glass House (1971, International Filmfestival Berlin), as Igor
 When Mother Went on Strike (1974), as Gabriel Gillhoff
 John Ralling (1974, TV Series)
 Derrick (1975, Season 2, Episode 1: "Mitternachtsbus"), as Erich Holler
  (1976), as Dr. Sand
 21 Hours at Munich (1976, TV Movie)
 A Bridge Too Far (1977), as German sentry
 Bier und Spiele (1977, TV Series), as Jupp Krüger
 Derrick (1978, Season 5, Episode 5: "Steins Tochter"), as Alexander Bork
 Sunday Children (1980), as Konradi
 Forgive Our Foolish Ways (1980, TV Movie)
  (1981, TV Movie)
 Jenny's War (1984, TV Movie)
  (1985), as Pater Roger Lee
 Escape from Sobibor (1987, TV Movie), as Hauptscharführer Gustav Wagner
 The Tenth One in Hiding (Portraits with Women / Nine plus One) (1988, Festival International du Film Cannes)
 A Quiet Conspiracy (1988, TV Movie)
 Triumph of the Spirit (1989), as Sturmbannführer Rauscher
 Young Catherine (1990, TV Mini-Series)
 Requiem per Voce e Pianoforte (1991, TV Movie)
 Gavre Princip - Himmel unter Steinen (1990), as Cpl. Moritz
 St. Petri Schnee (1991), as Fürst Praxatin
 Dr. Stefan Frank – Der Arzt, dem die Frauen vertrauen (1995, TV Series) as Dr. Ulrich Waldner
 SOKO 5113 (1995, Episode: "Der Keltendolch")
 Rosa Roth (1997, Episode: "The Voice")
 The Waiting Time (1999, TV Movie)
 Medicopter 117 (2000, Episode: "Gehertzt")
 A Touch of Love (2003, TV Movie)
 Leipzig Homicide (2004, TV Series)
 The Unforgotten (short film, 2005, Short)
 Montag kommen die Fenster (Windows will come on Monday) - (2005, International Film festival Berlin 2006), as Herr Buchner
 Crazy Partners (TV film, 2006)
 Love and Passion (TV film, 2007)
 The Gift (2008)
 Interim (2009)
  - One Murder too much (TV film, 2010)
 The German Friend (2012), as Herr Werner Kunheim
 Amatores Mea (short film, 2012)
 Couples (TV film, 2013)
 Verfehlung (2015), as Kardinal Schoeller
 Die Spezialisten - Miss Mai 1988 (TV film, 2016), as Big Toni
 Liebesfilm (2017), as Lenz Senior

References

External links
 

1938 births
2022 deaths
Male actors from Berlin
German male film actors
German male stage actors
German male television actors
20th-century German male actors
21st-century German male actors
Deaths from cancer in Germany